Pape Cheikh Diop Gueye (born 8 August 1997) is a Senegalese professional footballer who plays as a midfielder for La Liga club Elche. A youth international for Spain, he plays for the Senegal national team.

Club career

Youth
Diop was in Spain in the time at the age of 1 month. After representing Club Internacional de la Amistad and Montañeros CF, he joined Celta de Vigo's youth setup in 2013.

Celta
Diop made his senior debut with the reserves on 23 August 2014, coming on as a second-half substitute in a 2–0 Segunda División B away win against CD Lealtad. He scored his first goal eight days later, netting the last in a 5–0 home routing of UP Langreo.

On 11 August 2015, Diop signed a new five-year deal with the club, running until 2020. He made his first team – and La Liga – debut on 12 December of that year, replacing Nolito in the dying minutes of a 1–0 home success over RCD Espanyol.

Diop scored his first goal in the main category on 27 November 2016, netting the last in a 3–1 home win against Granada CF. The following 31 January, he extended his contract until 2021 and was definitely promoted to the main squad, being assigned the number 4 jersey.

Lyon
On 29 August 2017, Lyon announced the signing of Diop on a five-year deal. The transfer fee paid to Celta was reported as €10 million with €4 million of possible bonuses. On 14 August 2019, after featuring sparingly, he returned to his former side Celta on loan for the 2019–20 campaign.

Loan to Dijon 
On 6 August 2020, Diop signed for Ligue 1 club Dijon on loan for one season. The deal included an option to buy of €5 million plus an additional €1.5 million in bonuses, and a 15% sell-on fee clause. Diop made his debut for Dijon in a 1–0 loss to Angers on 22 August 2020.

Aris
On 29 June 2022, Diop put pen to paper to a two-year contract with Super League Greece club Aris.

Elche
On 14 February 2023, Free agent Diop joined La Liga side Elche after trialling with the side, he was signed to a contract on until the end of the season.

International career
Born in Senegal and raised in Spain, Diop was a youth international for Spain. In September 2018, Diop declared his international allegiance to Spain. He switched, and first represented the Senegal national team in a friendly 3–1 loss to Morocco on 9 October 2020.

Career statistics

Honours
Spain U19 
UEFA European Under-19 Championship: 2015

References

External links

1997 births
Living people
Footballers from Dakar
Senegalese footballers
Association football midfielders
Olympique Lyonnais players
Dijon FCO players
Aris Thessaloniki F.C. players
Elche CF players
Championnat National 2 players
Ligue 1 players
Super League Greece players
Senegal international footballers
Senegalese expatriate footballers
Senegalese expatriate sportspeople in France
Senegalese expatriate sportspeople in Spain
Senegalese expatriate sportspeople in Greece
Expatriate footballers in France
Expatriate footballers in Spain
Expatriate footballers in Greece
Senegalese emigrants to Spain
Naturalised citizens of Spain
Footballers from Galicia (Spain)
Spanish footballers
Celta de Vigo B players
RC Celta de Vigo players
Segunda División B players
La Liga players
Spain youth international footballers
Spain under-21 international footballers
Spanish people of Senegalese descent
Spanish sportspeople of African descent
Spanish expatriate footballers
Spanish expatriate sportspeople in Greece
Spanish expatriate sportspeople in France